Laughlin may refer to:

Places
Laughlin, California
Laughlin, Nevada
Laughlin Air Force Base
Laughlin (Nevada gaming area)

Other uses
Laughlin (surname)
Laughlin City, a fictional town in Alberta, Canada in the 2000 movie X-Men
Laughlin wavefunction, an ansatz for the ground state of a two-dimensional electron gas (physics)
Homer Laughlin China Company

See also
Lachlan (disambiguation)
Lochlann
McLaughlin (disambiguation)
Loughlin
Laflin, Pennsylvania
Fordyce L. Laflin